González is a municipality located in the Mexican state of Tamaulipas.

External links
Gobierno Municipal de González Official website

Municipalities of Tamaulipas